Japan Studio was a Japanese video game developer based in Tokyo. A first-party studio for Sony Interactive Entertainment (formerly Sony Computer Entertainment), it was best known for the Ape Escape, LocoRoco, Patapon, Gravity Rush and Knack series, the Team Ico games, Bloodborne, The Legend of Dragoon, and Astro's Playroom. In April 2021, Japan Studio was reorganized and merged with Team Asobi and other SIE studios.

History 
Japan Studio is based in Tokyo and was founded on 16 November 1993. It was formed shortly after the formation of the internal PlayStation division within Sony that included members from the Sony Corporation and the Sony Music Entertainment groups, with Japan Studio developing some of the initial games to be released on the first PlayStation console. According to Shuhei Yoshida, at the onset, the studio was run similar to Sony's music business, with lead external producers seeking out creative talent and help nurture them to help develop new games. Examples of these works included PaRappa the Rapper by Masaya Matsuura, and Everybody's Golf by Masashi Muramori.

Yoshida oversaw Japan Studio from 1996 through 2000. Yoshida started creating teams within Japan Studio and hired for them. New games such as Ape Escape and The Legend of Dragoon came out from Yoshida's approach, as well as dedicated teams such as Team Ico for Ico, and Polyphony Digital for Gran Turismo (which eventually was spun out as its own first-party developer for Sony). Alongside these first-party titles, the latter years of the original PlayStation saw strong third-party support, with games like Final Fantasy VII and Metal Gear Solid. According to Yoshida, this led Sony into some compliancy on relying on third-party games to support further consoles, and oversight and support for first-party games was less of a priority. Though Japan Studio's output during the PlayStation 2 years were strong, it struggled to release successful games during the PlayStation 3 era. Yoshida attributed this to the general game development practice in Japan which he described as a "grassroots and bottom up", without a clear vision of what a final game would look like, with exceptions being for people like Kazunori Yamauchi or Fumito Ueda who possessed a specific drive towards a product. In contrast to Western video game development, Yoshida said Japan Studio's methods tended to allow games to wander. Allen Becker, who led Japan Studio starting in 2011, said that their compliancy during the PlayStation 2 and PlayStation 3 era caused the studio to fall behind on updated tools and methodologies for game development.

Yoshida took over full control of Japan Studio in 2008, at the same time that the PlayStation 3 was out and Sony was preparing to launch the PlayStation 4 and PlayStation Vita. Around that time, mobile gaming and casual gaming started to become a major factor in the Asian video game market and drove competition from the consoles. Sony found that there was a lack of triple-A third-party support for these new products, and they had to turn to rely on their internal studios for game support. To get Japan Studio back on track, Sony brought in Becker, who had been working at Santa Monica Studio, to lead Japan Studio. Becker made several tough calls of the 40-some games that were in development at the time of his arrival to terminate development of those unlikely to be successful and implemented similar development processes as Sony's Western studios to get the studio back on track. Though Becker's approach, the studio was able to release shorter but cohesive titles that still reflected a Japanese approach to video games, such as Puppeteer, Rain and Knack. Also during this time, emphasis was place on The Last Guardian, the highly-anticipated third title from Ueda which had been in development for over six years, eventually released in 2016.

Across late 2020 and early 2021, several notable Japan Studio employees announced that they were departing the company. According to multiple sources speaking with Video Games Chronicle Sony had not renewed most of the contracts for the studio outside of those on the Team Asobi because the studio was not considered profitable enough to continue with original game development. In a statement, Sony stated that, as of 1 April 2021, Japan Studio would be re-centered around Team Asobi to build on the popularity of Astro's Playroom. Before and shortly after 1 April 2021, several additional Japan Studio staff announced their departure from the studio. Team Asobi was moved into PlayStation Studios in June 2021.

List of games

1994–1998

1999–2000

2001–2002

2003–2005

2006–2007

2008–2009

2010–2014

2015–2020

Former teams 
Japan Studio was formed by several internal development teams, with all of them being disbanded, reorganised, or spun off into a separate studio.

Team Asobi 

Team Asobi is a team founded in 2012 by Nicolas Doucet, who previously worked for London Studio and Saffire. In April 2021, they were formally spun off into a separate studio under SIE Worldwide Studios.

Sugar & Rockets 
Sugar & Rockets, previously known as Exact, worked on games like Ghost in the Shell, Popolocrois, Jumping Flash!, Robbit Mon Dieu, and Covert Ops: Nuclear Dawn.

Team Ico 

Team Ico developed Ico and Shadow of the Colossus. They were disbanded following lead game designer Fumito Ueda leaving the company and establishing genDESIGN.

Project Siren 
Project Siren, also known as Team Gravity, was a team formed in 1999 by former members of Team Silent, the creators of Silent Hill. The team was led by game designer and director Keiichiro Toyama, who, alongside designers Kazunobu Sato and Junya Okura, left Japan Studio in late 2020 to form Bokeh Game Studio.

Notes

References

External links 
  

First-party video game developers
Japanese companies established in 1993
2021 disestablishments in Japan
Software companies based in Tokyo
PlayStation Studios
Video game companies established in 1993
Defunct video game companies of Japan
Video game development companies
Video game companies disestablished in 2021